Mario Kopić (born 13 March 1965) is a philosopher, author and translator. His main areas of interest include: the history of ideas, the philosophy of art, the philosophy of culture, phenomenology and the philosophy of religion.

Kopić is influenced by and writes extensively on Friedrich Nietzsche, Martin Heidegger, Hannah Arendt, Jacques Derrida, Gianni Vattimo, Reiner Schürmann and Dušan Pirjevec. He also translated works by Nietzsche (Thus Spoke Zarathustra, On the Genealogy of Morality), Giorgio Agamben, Gianni Vattimo, Jacques Derrida, Emmanuel Levinas and Dušan Pirjevec into Croatian.

Life and work 
Mario Kopić was born in Dubrovnik, Croatia, former Yugoslavia. He studied philosophy and comparative literature at the University of Zagreb; phenomenology and anthropology at the University of Ljubljana; the history of ideas at the Institute Friedrich Meinecke at the Free University of Berlin (under the mentorship of Ernst Nolte); and comparative religion and anthropology of religion at the Sapienza University of Rome (under the mentorship of Ida Magli).

Mario Kopić's philosophical work is under the influence of the Italian philosophical approach known as pensiero debole or "weak thought", the political thought of Arendt, and the ethical-political thought of late Derrida.

In his latest works The Unhealable Wound of the World, The Challenges of the Post-metaphysics, Sextant and The Beats of the Other Kopić developed a kind of onto-politics of liberal-conservative postmodernism and the post-anthropocentric humanism. For him the world is the space of being as event, and only then the arena of national and social or political conflict. The world, or existence, is our ontological responsibility, which precedes political, judicial and moral responsibility.

Kopić appears in Igor Ivanov Izi's 1995 film N.E.P.

Published books 
 Art and Philosophy: An Anthology (Filozofija i umjetnost - Antologija), Delo 11-12 /1990, Belgrade 1990.
 Experiencing the Margins of the Sense (Iskušavanje rubova smisla: pabirci iz estetike), Dubrovnik 1991. 
 With Nietzsche on Europe (S Nietzscheom o Europi), Zagreb 2001.
 Nietzsche and Evola: The Thought as Destiny (Nietzsche e Evola: il pensiero come destino), Rome 2001.
 A Trial to the West (Proces Zapadu), Dubrovnik 2003. 
 The Challenges of the Post-Metaphysics (Izazovi post-metafizike), Sremski Karlovci - Novi Sad 2007. 
 The Unhealable Wound of the World (Nezacjeljiva rana svijeta), Zagreb 2007. 
 Gianni Vattimo Reader (Ed.),(Gianni Vattimo: Čitanka (Ur.)), Zagreb 2008. 
 Dušan Pirjevec, Death and Nothing (ed.), (Smrt i niština, (Ur.)) Zagreb 2009. 
 Sextant: The Outlines of the Spiritual Foundations of the World (Sekstant: Skice o duhovnim temeljima svijeta), Belgrade 2010. 
 The Beats of the Other (Otkucaji drugoga), Belgrade 2013. 
 The Windows: Essays on Art and Literature (Prozori: Ogledi o umjetnosti), Dubrovnik 2015. 
 Darkness in the Pupil of the Sun: Philosophical Essays (Tama u zjenici sunca: Filozofski ogledi), Dubrovnik 2018 
 Desire and Striving (Žudnja i stremljenje), Zagreb 2018 
 Against the Obvious (Protiv samorazumljivosti), With Vedran Salvia, Dubrovnik 2020. 
 The Otherworld according to Dante Alighieri (Prekogroblje po Danteu), Zagreb 2021.

See also 
Continental philosophy
Postmodern Christianity
Ontotheology
Phenomenology (philosophy)
Phenomenology of religion

References

Sources 
Interview with Mario Kopić, Zarez, 2008 
Interview with Mario Kopić, Danas, 2010 
Interview with Mario Kopić, Dubrovački list, 2011 
Interview with Mario Kopić, Dubrovački list, 2015 
Nezacjeljiva rana svijeta 
2011 article by Mario Kopić about Hannah Arendt  
2012 article by Mario Kopić about Heidegger  
2013 article by Mario Kopić about Derrida  
2015 article by Mario Kopić about Reiner Schürmann

External links 
Comments on Jacques Derrida's Les Spectres de Marx  by Mario Kopić
Kafka and Nationalism by Mario Kopić
M. Kopić Heideggers Wiederholungsverständnis 2013. 
M. Kopić Le peuple, la nation et l'(im)pouvoir 2012. 
M. Kopić Paul Ricoeur – filozof čitanja 2005. 

1965 births
20th-century anthropologists
20th-century Croatian non-fiction writers
20th-century Croatian philosophers
20th-century essayists
20th-century translators
21st-century anthropologists
21st-century Croatian non-fiction writers
21st-century Croatian philosophers
21st-century essayists
21st-century translators
Anthologists
Continental philosophers
Critical theorists
Croatian anthropologists
Croatian essayists
Croatian ethicists
Croatian non-fiction writers
Croatian philosophers
Epistemologists
Existentialists
Free University of Berlin alumni
Heidegger scholars
Historians of philosophy
Intellectual history
Living people
Metaphilosophers
Metaphysicians
Metaphysics writers
Nietzsche scholars
Ontologists
People from Dubrovnik
Phenomenologists
Philosophers of art
Philosophers of culture
Philosophers of education
Philosophers of history
Philosophers of literature
Philosophers of love
Philosophers of mind
Philosophers of religion
Philosophers of social science
Political philosophers
Sapienza University of Rome alumni
Social commentators
Social philosophers
Theorists on Western civilization
University of Ljubljana alumni
University of Zagreb alumni
Writers about activism and social change
Writers about globalization
Writers about religion and science
Male non-fiction writers